Gazania  is a genus of flowering plants in the family Asteraceae, native to Southern Africa.

They produce large, daisy-like composite flowerheads in brilliant shades of yellow and orange, over a long period in summer. They are often planted as drought-tolerant groundcover.

Taxonomic history

The genus was first formally described by German botanist Joseph Gaertner in the second volume of his major work De Fructibus et Seminibus Plantarum in 1791. Gaertner named the genus after Theodorus Gaza, a 15th-century translator of the works of Theophrastus.

Gazania is a member of the tribe Arctotideae and the subtribe Gorteriinae. Within the subtribe it is close to Hirpicium and Gorteria. Many of the species of Gazania are hard to distinguish and the number of species assigned to the genus has varied widely from one author to another.

In 1959, Helmut Roessler published what he considered to be a preliminary revision of Gazania. At that time, he recognized 16 species. Roessler published some amendments to his treatment in 1973.

In 2009, a phylogeny of the genus was published. It was based on molecular phylogenetic analysis of chloroplast and nuclear DNA sequences. In this study, all of Roessler's species except Gazania othonnites were sampled. The authors found that eight species were not really separate, but formed a species complex. The seven species found to be distinct were G. jurineifolia, G. caespitosa, G. ciliaris, G. tenuifolia, G. heterochaeta, G. schenckii, and G. lichtensteinii.

Distribution
The genus occurs from low-altitude sands to alpine meadows in South Africa, Eswatini, Mozambique, Tanzania, and Angola. Additionally, species are naturalised and declared weed in South Australia, New Zealand, the Mediterranean, and California.

Cultivation
Gazania species are grown for the brilliant colour of their flowerheads which appear in the late spring and are often in bloom throughout the summer into autumn. They prefer a sunny position and are tolerant of dryness and poor soils.

Numerous cultivars have been selected for variety of colour and habit. In temperate regions, they are usually grown as half-hardy annuals. A commonly grown variety is the trailing gazania (Gazania rigens var. leucolaena). It is commonly used as groundcover and can be planted en masse to cover large areas or embankments, assisted by its fast growth rate. Cultivars of this variety include 'Sunburst', 'Sunglow', and 'Sunrise Yellow'. Another popular cultivated variety is the clumping gazania (Gazania rigens), which has a number of named cultivars including 'Aztec', 'Burgundy', 'Copper King', 'Fiesta Red', 'Goldrush' and 'Moonglow'.

The following cultivars have gained the Royal Horticultural Society’s Award of Garden Merit:
 G. ‘Aztec’ 
 G. ‘Cookei’ 
 G. rigens ‘Variegata’ 
 Talent Series

Species

Gallery

See also
 List of Gazania cultivars

References

External links
 
 PlantZafrica.com: Gazania krebsiana

 
Annual plants
Asteraceae genera
Flora of Southern Africa
Garden plants of Africa

zh:勋章菊